Colleton Preparatory Academy is a pre-kindergarten to 12th grade school in Walterboro, South Carolina, United States.

History
The school opened in 1966 as a segregation academy under the name John C. Calhoun Academy, who was a famous proponent of slavery. During its first school year it was housed in Grace Advent Christian Church. The following year, it moved to its own campus where it remains today. It had been one of 111 schools whose tax-exempt status had been contested by the Internal Revenue Service.  In 1990, exemption was granted and the school renamed Colleton.

Academics

The school offers two tracks for high school students: college prep and early college, in coordination with University of South Carolina Salkehatchie.

The school is accredited by the South Carolina Independent School Association.

Athletics

Colleton competes in baseball, basketball, football, softball, tennis, volleyball, cheerleading, golf and soccer.

References

Private high schools in South Carolina
Private middle schools in South Carolina
Private elementary schools in South Carolina
Preparatory schools in South Carolina
Segregation academies in South Carolina